The Ayer Public Library is a Carnegie library located at 200 Locust Street in Delavan, Illinois. The library was the city's fifth attempt at forming a library; it succeeded and assumed the collection of a library founded in 1902 by the Blue Button Army temperance organization. When the Blue Button library closed in 1907, supporter Amos K. Ayer called for the city to establish a permanent public library. With Ayer's financial backing, a library for all citizens of Delavan Township was approved the same year; however, it used a temporary space and lacked a permanent home until the city applied to the Carnegie Foundation for assistance in 1912. After a protracted misunderstanding with James Bertram, who expected a city library tax and did not understand that the township provided tax support, the Foundation provided a $10,000 grant for the library and construction began in 1914. The Classical Revival library opened later in the year; it remains open to this day.

The library was added to the National Register of Historic Places on November 12, 1998.

References 

Libraries on the National Register of Historic Places in Illinois
Carnegie libraries in Illinois
Neoclassical architecture in Illinois
Library buildings completed in 1914
National Register of Historic Places in Tazewell County, Illinois
Public libraries in Illinois